This is a list of cases reported in volume 73 (6 Wall.) of United States Reports, decided by the Supreme Court of the United States in 1867 and 1868.

Nominative reports 
In 1874, the U.S. government created the United States Reports, and retroactively numbered older privately-published case reports as part of the new series.  As a result, cases appearing in volumes 1–90 of U.S. Reports have dual citation forms; one for the volume number of U.S. Reports, and one for the volume number of the reports named for the relevant reporter of decisions (these are called "nominative reports").

John William Wallace 
Starting with the 66th volume of U.S. Reports, the Reporter of Decisions of the Supreme Court of the United States was John William Wallace. Wallace was Reporter of Decisions from 1863 to 1874, covering volumes 68 through 90 of United States Reports which correspond to volumes 1 through 23 of his Wallace's Reports. As such, the dual form of citation to, for example, Prentice v. Pickersgill is 73 U.S. (6 Wall.) 511 (1867).

Wallace's Reports were the final nominative reports for the US Supreme Court; starting with volume 91, cases were identified simply as "(volume #) U.S. (page #) (year)".

Justices of the Supreme Court at the time of 73 U.S. (6 Wall.) 

The Supreme Court is established by Article III, Section 1 of the Constitution of the United States, which says: "The judicial Power of the United States, shall be vested in one supreme Court . . .". The size of the Court is not specified; the Constitution leaves it to Congress to set the number of justices. Under the Judiciary Act of 1789 Congress originally fixed the number of justices at six (one chief justice and five associate justices). Since 1789 Congress has varied the size of the Court from six to seven, nine, ten, and back to nine justices (always including one chief justice).

To prevent President Andrew Johnson from appointing any justices, a hostile Congress passed the Judicial Circuits Act of 1866, eliminating three of the ten seats from the Supreme Court as they became vacant, and so potentially reducing the size of the court to seven justices. The vacancy caused by the death of Justice John Catron in 1865 had not been filled, so after Justice James Moore Wayne died in July 1867 there were eight justices left on the court when the cases in 73 U.S. (6 Wall.) were decided:

Notable Cases in 73 U.S. (6 Wall.)

Crandall v. Nevada
In Crandall v. Nevada,          73 U.S. (6 Wall.) 35 (1868), the Supreme Court held that a state cannot inhibit people from leaving the state by taxing them.  A Nevada statute imposed a $1 tax on every person leaving the state by railroad, stage coach, or other vehicles engaged or employed in the business of transporting passengers for hire.  The Court reasoned that the right to travel is a fundamental right.  The people of the United States constitute one nation, and so no state may impose a tax on a person for the "privilege" of travel from or for passing through it.

Georgia v. Stanton
In Georgia v. Stanton,       73 U.S. (6 Wall.) 50 (1868), the Supreme Court held that it does not have jurisdiction over the political question of enforcement of the Reconstruction Acts against southern states.  The case involved the federal government annulling state governments and replacing them with new ones.

Citation style 

Under the Judiciary Act of 1789 the federal court structure at the time comprised District Courts, which had general trial jurisdiction; Circuit Courts, which had mixed trial and appellate (from the US District Courts) jurisdiction; and the United States Supreme Court, which had appellate jurisdiction over the federal District and Circuit courts—and for certain issues over state courts. The Supreme Court also had limited original jurisdiction (i.e., in which cases could be filed directly with the Supreme Court without first having been heard by a lower federal or state court). There were one or more federal District Courts and/or Circuit Courts in each state, territory, or other geographical region.

Bluebook citation style is used for case names, citations, and jurisdictions.  
 e.g.,"C.C.D.N.J." = United States Circuit Court for the District of New Jersey
 e.g.,"D. Mass." = United States District Court for the District of Massachusetts 
 "E." = Eastern; "M." = Middle; "N." = Northern; "S." = Southern; "W." = Western
 e.g.,"C.C.S.D.N.Y." = United States Circuit Court for the Southern District of New York
 e.g.,"M.D. Ala." = United States District Court for the Middle District of Alabama
 "Ct. Cl." = United States Court of Claims
 The abbreviation of a state's name alone indicates the highest appellate court in that state's judiciary at the time. 
 e.g.,"Pa." = Supreme Court of Pennsylvania
 e.g.,"Me." = Supreme Judicial Court of Maine

List of cases in 73 U.S. (6 Wall.)

Notes and references

See also
certificate of division

External links
  Case reports in volume 73 (6 Wall.) from Library of Congress
  Case reports in volume 73 (6 Wall.) from Court Listener
  Case reports in volume 73 (6 Wall.) from the Caselaw Access Project of Harvard Law School
  Case reports in volume 73 (6 Wall.) from Google Scholar
  Case reports in volume 73 (6 Wall.) from Justia
  Case reports in volume 73 (6 Wall.) from Open Jurist
 Website of the United States Supreme Court
 United States Courts website about the Supreme Court
 National Archives, Records of the Supreme Court of the United States
 American Bar Association, How Does the Supreme Court Work?
 The Supreme Court Historical Society

1867 in United States case law
1868 in United States case law